"Don't Give Up" is a song written by English musician Peter Gabriel and recorded as a duet with Kate Bush for Gabriel's fifth solo studio album So (1986). The single version was released as the second single from the album in the UK in 1986 and as the fifth single in the US in 1987.

It spent eleven weeks in the UK Top 75 chart in 1986, peaking at number nine. The song was included in Gabriel's Secret World Live tour featuring singer Paula Cole.  The DVD release of a performance in Italy in 1993 (released in 1994) included the duet. An all-orchestral recording featuring Ane Brun was released on Gabriel's New Blood album in 2011. In 1987, the song won Ivor Novello Award for Best Song Musically and Lyrically.

Background
The song was inspired by the Depression-era photographs of Dorothea Lange, showing poverty-stricken Americans in Dust Bowl conditions. Gabriel saw Lange's images in a 1973 book titled In This Proud Land. He felt that a song based on this was wholly appropriate to difficult economic conditions in England under the premiership of Margaret Thatcher. He composed lyrics about a man whose unemployment causes stress in his domestic relationship. The verses, sung by Gabriel, describe the man's feelings of isolation, loneliness and despair; the choruses, sung by Bush, offer words of hope and encouragement.

Gabriel originally wrote the song from a reference point of American roots music and he approached country singer Dolly Parton to sing it with him. However, Parton turned it down, so his friend Kate Bush took her place.

In a 2014 interview, Elton John  attributed his sobriety to the song, in particular the lyric from Bush, "Rest your head. You worry too much. It’s going to be all right. When times get rough you can fall back on us. Don’t give up." He states, "she [Bush] played a big part in my rebirth. That record helped me so much."

Track listing
All songs written by Peter Gabriel.

Personnel

 Manu Katché – drums, percussion
 Tony Levin – bass guitar
 David Rhodes – guitars
 Richard Tee – piano
 Peter Gabriel – vocals, CMI, Prophet, Linn, piano
 Simon Clark – chorus CS-80
 Kate Bush – guest vocals

Videos
Two videos were created for the song. The first, by Godley & Creme, is a single take of Gabriel and Bush, as they sing, in an embrace, while the sun behind them enters a total eclipse and re-emerges. (Of the shoot, Gabriel remarked, "There are worse ways of earning a living.") The video was featured the final broadcast of the channel Europa TV in November 1986.

A second video, directed by Grammy award-winning Jim Blashfield and produced by Melissa Marsland in 1988, features the singers’ faces superimposed over film of a town and its people in disrepair.

Charts

Weekly charts

Year-end charts

Other versions

Willie Nelson and Sinéad O'Connor version

The song was covered as a duet between American musician Willie Nelson & Irish singer Sinéad O'Connor in 1993. The single is included on Nelson's Across the Borderline album, produced by Don Was, Paul Simon, and Roy Halee. O'Connor sings Kate Bush's parts in the song. In an interview with Los Angeles Times, Nelson talked about the duet and how it was made. He said:

A music video was made to accompany the song, featuring both singers. It has a sepia tone. It was reported that funds raised by sales of the single were in excess of $300,000.

Critical reception
Martin Monkman from AllMusic felt the duet is the "most stunning song" on the album, and "a brilliant piece of casting." He added, "Nelson and O'Connor's rendition is quietly triumphant and every bit as powerful as Gabriel and Bush's original." John Davis from Austin American-Statesman wrote, "The teaming of his crisp, autumnal baritone with the ethereal, spun-steel counterpoint of O'Connor's voice on Gabriel's paean of hope, "Don't Give Up", is little short of haunting. It is arguably the album's most arresting interlude, as well as Nelson's most accomplished pass ever at a modern pop song. And it nearly did not happen at all." Bill DeYoung from Gainesville Sun described the duet as "heartfelt". Paul Freeman from Los Angeles Times called it "a striking duet". Pan-European magazine Music & Media remarked that Nelson's version "makes a rodeo queen out of his duet partner". An editor from Pittsburgh Post-Gazette wrote that Nelson and O'Connor "make an odd but effective couple" on Peter Gabriel's emotional "Don't Give Up". David Zimmerman from USA Today named it a "wonderful stop" on the album, noting its "hope-and-despair seesaw".

Track listing
 "Don't Give Up"
 "Don't Give Up" (Instrumental)

Alicia Keys and Bono version

"Don't Give Up" was recorded by American recording artist Alicia Keys and Irish musician Bono. Retitled "Don't Give Up (Africa)", the song was produced by Keys and Steve Lillywhite. On 6 December 2005, the song was released as a single exclusively on iTunes and a ringtone version was released by Cingular Wireless. The proceeds of the release went to the charity Keep a Child Alive, for which Keys is a spokesperson. Keys commented that "I love this song. And I love Bono. I really respect what he has done for Africa and how he has used his fame to do good in the world. I hope I can do half as much in my life". Keys and Bono performed the song live at Keys' charity event the Black Ball, which raises money for the organization Keep A Child Alive. They performed the song also on The Oprah Winfrey Show in October 2006.

The recording of the song took place at the Oven Studios on Long Island. Keys spoke of the recording session at the studio with Bono and Steve Lillywhite:

Track listing

Charts

Jann Klose and Annie Haslam version
Jann Klose and Renaissance vocalist and painter Annie Haslam released their version, produced by Rave Tesar in June 2017. The recording features Jann Klose on acoustic guitar and lead vocals, Annie Haslam on lead vocals, John Arbo on upright bass, Rob Mitzner on cajon and Rave Tesar on keys. Proceeds from the sale of the recording benefit Desmond Tutu's TutuDesk foundation.

Shannon Noll and Natalie Bassingthwaighte version

A cover version was recorded by Australian artist Shannon Noll and former Rogue Traders frontwoman Natalie Bassingthwaighte. It was produced by Michael "fingaz" Mugisha who also produced hits for Jessica Mauboy, Big Brovaz and recorded for the compilation Home: Songs of Hope & Journey. It was released as a charity single for the depression organisation beyondblue. It was the most added song to Australian radio in its first week. It made its debut at number seven on the Australian Singles Chart, and, in its second week, climbed to number two with a Platinum certification. The song was also performed live on the fifth season of Dancing with the Stars. The music video features Noll and Bassingthwaighte in the studio recording the single.

Charts
Weekly charts

Year-end charts

Certifications

Others
Maire Brennan and Michael McDonald recorded a gender-reversed version of the song on the 1999 Contemporary Christian album Streams.

The song was covered by Olivia Taylor Dudley and Hale Appleman in the penultimate episode of the Magicians (The Balls), which aired on 25 March 2020.

References

1980s ballads
1986 singles
1993 singles
2005 singles
2006 singles
Alicia Keys songs
Geffen Records singles
Kate Bush songs
Lady Gaga songs
Male–female vocal duets
Music videos directed by Godley and Creme
Music videos directed by Jim Blashfield
Natalie Bassingthwaighte songs
Peter Gabriel songs
Pop ballads
Rock ballads
Shannon Noll songs
Sinéad O'Connor songs
Song recordings produced by Daniel Lanois
Songs about loneliness
Songs about suicide
Songs written by Peter Gabriel
Sony BMG singles
Willie Nelson songs
Song recordings produced by Alicia Keys